Nhoabe viettealis is a species of snout moth in the genus Nhoabe. It was described by Hubert Marion in 1955 and is known from Madagascar.

Subspecies
Nhoabe viettealis suarezalis P. Leraut, 2006

References

External links
Original description: Marion, H. (1955). "Pyrales nouvelles de Madagascar". Bulletin de la Société entomologique de France. 60 (7-8): 116–117 

Moths described in 1955
Pyralinae
Moths of Madagascar